The Arfon transmitting station is a facility for FM, DAB digital radio and television transmission near the villages of Nebo and Nasareth in Gwynedd, northwestern Wales. It includes a  guyed mast with antennas attached at various heights. It is owned and operated by Arqiva.

History
The station was built by the ITA in the early 1960s to provide a 405-line ITV Band III (VHF) TV service for north west Wales.  Unlike the BBC, which served the area from Llanddona (on the island of Anglesey), Arfon gave better coverage to some areas. The tower was completed in 1962 and began broadcasting on 9 November of that year.

In October 1975 the site became a medium power UHF analogue colour television relay of Llanddona, at the time carrying BBC One, BBC Two and ITV.  S4C was added in 1982.

405-line TV was finally discontinued in the UK in 1985, but it appears that Arfon's VHF transmitters were decommissioned a year early in 1984 and 

More recently, Police and Ambulance communications have been added, in addition to mobile (cellular) telephone antennas. In 1993, Classic FM began using the site for FM coverage of north west Wales in preference to Llanddona (the BBC's regional FM site), partly due to a dispute over BBC charges for sharing fees of its transmitter masts and antennas, but more because Arfon, in conjunction with Great Orme's Head (near Llandudno) gave Classic FM better coverage than the BBC sites.

On 16 November 1998, local commercial radio station Champion 103 launched from studios in Bangor with its transmitter at Arfon.

The mast had its aircraft warning lights replaced in Summer 2006 to red lamps employing arrays of ultrabright LEDs.

On 18 July 2006, national digital radio network Digital One began broadcasting from the station.

Coverage area
The primary television service area includes most of Anglesey and central parts of the Llŷn Peninsula, however many viewers in south Dublin and north County Wicklow can also receive Arfon's broadcasts. The radio service area is slightly larger, reaching further down Cardigan Bay towards Tonfanau near Tywyn.

Channels listed by frequency

Analogue television

9 November 1962 – October 1975
Initially, Arfon was a relay of Preseli, receiving its 405-line VHF transmission off-air on channel 8 and rebroadcasting it on channel 10.

October 1975 – 1 November 1982
With the coming of colour TV on 625 lines, Arfon acted as a relay of Llanddona, whilst continuing to relay Preseli's VHF transmission.

1 November 1982 – January 1984
1982 saw the rollout of the UK's 4th planned UHF television channel. As with all Welsh transmitters, Arfon was required to carry S4C instead of Channel 4 which is broadcast to the rest of the United Kingdom.

January 1984 – 21 October 2009
After 22 years of VHF television from this site, the service was discontinued in January 1984. On UHF, Arfon was destined only ever to transmit the originally-planned four of the eventual five analogue terrestrial television channels.

Analogue and digital television

21 October 2009 – 18 November 2009
There never was a pre-DSO digital TV service from Arfon.

DSO for the repeaters of Llanddona occurred between 21 October & 18 November 2009. In preparation for this, the transmitting antenna at the top of the Arfon mast was replaced in March 2008.

On 21 October, BBC2 Analogue was switched off, and ITV1 Wales took over its frequency for its final three weeks of service. BBC Mux A took over channel 41 that had just been vacated by ITV.

Digital television

18 November 2009 – present
The analogue television transmissions from Arfon ceased and were replaced by digital transmissions. Unusually for the UK, the digital transmissions from this site are considerably more powerful than is usual practice considering the ERP of the analogue services that they replace.

Analogue radio (FM VHF)

Digital radio (DAB)

† MuxCo North west Wales is on this transmitter carrying both the Welsh language Capital Cymru and the English Capital North Wales coast.
Also carries Smooth radio. Nation Radio Wales and Dragon radio.

See also
:Category:Transmitter sites in the United Kingdom
List of masts
List of tallest buildings and structures in Great Britain
List of radio stations in the United Kingdom

References

External links
 MB21's page on 405 TV to Wales and the West
 405 Alive's list of transmitters
 More details on 405-line ITV transmitters
 The Transmission Gallery: Photographs and Information
 The Transmission Gallery: Coverage Map
 http://skyscraperpage.com/diagrams/?b54126
  Arfon Transmitter at thebigtower.com

Buildings and structures in Gwynedd
Transmitter sites in Wales